Tenagra Observatory and Tenagra Observatory II are astronomical observatories in Cottage Grove, Oregon and Arizona. The observatories house heavily automated robotic telescopes.

Circa 2016, the observatory was utilized with the Katzman Automatic Imaging Telescope a member of the Lick Observatory and Tenagra Observatory Supernova Searches (LOTOSS).

Beginning in 2018, after a NASA grant to owner Michael Schwartz expired, control of the Arizona observatory was turned over to Gianluca Masis Virtual Telescope project.

Instruments
The observatory near Cottage Grove, Oregon was constructed  1998, and had a  Celestron Schmidt-Cassegrain with a SBIG CCD imager, probably upgraded to Apogee Instruments later.

The Arizona observatory at Patagonia, 20 miles from Nogales, began operations in 2000. Tenagra II is a custom-made  Ritchey-Chretien telescope manufactured by SciTech Astronomical Research, in operation since 2001. "Pearl" is a  f/3.75 corrected Newtonian. There is also a  SciTech Ritchey-Chretien, and another 14-inch Celestron.

The Oregon site was in use as of 2004 as a backup site, during the Southwest monsoon season.

Observations and public outreach
The robotic telescopes can image 1,000 galaxies in an evening for supernova discovery. Using the Oregon Tenagra I telescope, its maker became "the first amateur to achieve consistent supernova discoveries" by using a robotic telescope "to patrol hundreds of galaxies each night".

The Oregon observatory reported 77 Minor Planet Electronic Circulars between 1999 and 2002.

The Oregon observatory discovered supernova .

The observatory discovered comet  in May 2011.

Comet  is named for the observatory and Clyde Tombaugh. Tombaugh initially discovered it in January 1931, but was not recovered until 2012. It was provisionally named Comet P/2012 WX_32 (Tenagra) when recovered by  Michael Schwartz and Paulo R. Holvorcem using Tenagra II.

The observatory's Tenagra IV instrument, along with Palomar Observatory's Samuel Oschin telescope, was the second to image dwarf planet Sedna, providing confirmation of its discovery and refining its orbital parameters.

In 2018, Pearl imaged the Tesla Roadster in space, when it had a magnitude of 15.5, comparable to Pluto's moon Charon.

In 2018, imagery from the Arizona observatory was livestreamed by Gianluca Masi during the  close approach to Earth as a  Virtual Telescope project outreach event. Images of the Tiangong-1 space station in its decaying orbit were livestreamed in 2018, a few days before reentry.

Awards
2013 Edgar Wilson Award

See also
List of asteroid-discovering observatories#Tenagra II Observatory
List of minor planet discoverers
"Darmok"
Winer Observatory

References

Sources

https://ui.adsabs.harvard.edu/abs/2011IAUC.9211....1H/abstract

Further reading

External links 

Astronomical observatories in Arizona
Buildings and structures in Lane County, Oregon
Buildings and structures in Santa Cruz County, Arizona